So, also spelled Soh, is a Korean family name and an element in Korean given names. Its meaning depends on the hanja used to write it.

Family name
The Korean surname So is normally written with either of two hanja, indicating different lineages:
:  The largest bon-gwan is Jinju. This is the more common of the two lineages; the 2000 South Korean census found 39,552 people with this family name, belonging to 12,270 households. Most were located in Seoul (9,494), Jeollabuk-do (8,579), or Gyeonggi-do (7,144).
: The largest bon-gwan is Pyongsan, whose members trace the lineage back to Myeongjong of Goryeo. This is the less common of the two lineages; the 2000 South Korean census found 9,904 people with this family name, belonging to 3,096 households. Most were also located in Seoul (2,424), Gyeonggi-do (2,101), or Jeollabuk-do (1,189).
: . The 2000 South Korean census found one person with this surname, living in Jeju-do, who was not a member of a household. There were also an additional 70 people who wrote their surname with the same hanja, but pronounced it Cho (초) instead; 39 of them lived in Jeju-do as well.

In a study by the National Institute of the Korean Language based on 2007 application data for South Korean passports, it was found that 91% of people with this surname spelled it in Latin letters as So in their passports, while 9% spelled it Soh.

Koreans with these family names include:
Ky-Chun So (born 1958), South Korean theologian
So Hyun-kyung (born 1965), South Korean television screenwriter
June-Young Soh (born 1965), South Korean musical director
So Chan-whee (born Kim Kyoung-hee, 1972), South Korean singer
So Ji-sub (born 1977), South Korean actor
So Yoo-jin (born 1981), South Korean actress
So Yi-hyun (born Jo Woo-jung, 1984), South Korean actress

In given names

Names with this element
Korean names containing the element "so" include:
So-hee
So-hyun
So-won
So-yeon
So-yi
So-young

The name Sora is not composed of two separate hanja characters "so" and "ra", but rather comes from a single native Korean word meaning "conch shell".

Hanja and meaning
There are 45 hanja with the reading "so", and variant forms of six of those, on the South Korean government's official list of hanja which may be registered for use in given names; they are:

 : "small"
 ; "few", "young"
 : "place"
 : "disappear"
 : "originally"; "white"
 : "laugh"
 (variant)
 : "summon"
 : "bright"
 : "revive"; Perilla frutescens
 (variant)
 : "clamour"
 : "burn"
 : "complain"
 : "sweep"
 : "connect"
 (variant)
 : "vegetable"
 : "pond"
 : "illuminate"
 : "continue"
 : name of a country; used as a surname
 :
 : "nest"
 : "go upstream"
 (variant)
 : "wavering of a tree"
 : "beautiful jade"
 : "whistle"
 : "sculpt in clay"
 : "nighttime"
 : "scrape"
 : "comb"
 : name of a river
 : "itch"
 : sasa borealis (a species of bamboo)
 : tungso (a Korean traditional flute)
 : "solitary"
 : "stroll"
 : "melt"
 : "sincerity"
 : ; "awaken"; "collect"
 : "high"
 : "sky"
 (variant)
 : "strive"
 : "halt"; "pure"
 : "gemstone"
 : "look towards"
 : "salt"

See also
List of Korean names

References

Korean-language surnames
Korean given names